Stefan Vasilev (born 8 September 1968) is a Bulgarian bobsledder. He competed in the two man event at the 2002 Winter Olympics.

References

1968 births
Living people
Bulgarian male bobsledders
Olympic bobsledders of Bulgaria
Bobsledders at the 2002 Winter Olympics